Samantha Reeves and Adriana Serra Zanetti were the defending champions, but Serra Zanetti decided not to participate this year.

Reeves partnered with Jessica Steck and successfully defended her title, defeating María Emilia Salerni and Fabiola Zuluaga 4–6, 6–3, 7–5 in the final.

Seeds

Draw

References
Main Draw

Challenge Bell
Tournoi de Québec
Can